Live at the Berlin Philharmonie  is a 1970 live album by Dave Brubeck and his trio with Gerry Mulligan recorded at the Berlin Philharmonie. It was reissued in 1995 with several bonus tracks. The album peaked at 21 on the Billboard Top Jazz Charts.

Reception 

The 1995 reissue of Live at the Berlin Philharmonie was reviewed by Scott Yanow at Allmusic who wrote that "Considering how inspired the Dave Brubeck Quartet sounds, it is surprising that the music has been so obscure for so long. Baritonist Gerry Mulligan is particularly heated on the opening two numbers (the unreleased tracks), pianist Dave Brubeck really stretches himself (check him out on "Things Ain't What They Used to Be" where he progresses from stride to free), and bassist Jack Six and drummer Alan Dawson, in addition to their solo space, are quite alert and constantly pushing the lead voices. Not only are the musicians in top form but the audience is very enthusiastic, demanding three encores. The extensive liner notes by Geoffrey Smith are also a major plus. Highly recommended."

Track listing 
For the 1972 US LP issue:
 "Things Ain't What They Used to Be" (Duke Ellington, Mercer Ellington, Ted Persons) - 14:55
 "Blessed Are the Poor (The Sermon on the Mount)" (Dave Brubeck) - 9:04
 "Indian Song" (Brubeck) - 10:58
 "Limehouse Blues" (Philip Braham, Douglas Furber) - 9:52
 "Lullaby de Mexico" (Mulligan) - 5:03

For the 1995 CD reissue:
CD 1
 "Out of Nowhere" (Johnny Green, Edward Heyman) - 10:59
 "Mexican Jumping Bean" (Gerry Mulligan) - 9:24
 "Blessed Are the Poor (The Sermon on the Mount)" (Dave Brubeck) - 9:04
 "Things Ain't What They Used to Be" (Duke Ellington, Mercer Ellington, Ted Persons) - 14:55
 "Out of the Way of the People" (Brubeck) - 6:49
CD 2
 "The Duke" (Brubeck) - 7:51
 "New Orleans" (Hoagy Carmichael) - 16:01
 "Indian Song" (Brubeck) - 10:58
 "Limehouse Blues" (Philip Braham, Douglas Furber) - 9:52
 "St. Louis Blues" (W. C. Handy) - 6:43
 "Basin Street Blues" (Spencer Williams) - 4:46
 "Take Five" (Paul Desmond) - 4:00
 "Lullaby de Mexico" (Mulligan) - 5:03

Personnel 
 Dave Brubeck - piano, producer
 Gerry Mulligan - baritone saxophone
 Jack Six - double bass
 Alan Dawson - drums
Production
 Russell Gloyd - compilation producer, producer
 Mark Wilder - digital mastering, mastering
 Gary Pacheco - series director
 Barry Hatcher - liner notes, project director
 Geoffrey Smith - liner notes
 Tom "Curly" Ruff - mastering
 Gina Campanaro, Robert Constanzo - packaging manager
 Hans Harzheim - photography
 Rita Cox - project director

References 

1970 live albums
Columbia Records live albums
Dave Brubeck live albums
Live instrumental albums